AeroEjecutivos C.A. was a Venezuelan scheduled and charter regional airline headquartered in Maiquetia and based at Óscar Machado Zuloaga International Airport.

Destinations
As of September 2006, the airline operated scheduled services to:

Canaima (Canaima Airport)
Caracas (Óscar Machado Zuloaga International Airport) Hub
El Yavi (El Yavi Airport)
Los Roques (Los Roques Airport)

Fleet

AeroEjecutivos is one of the few airlines in South America and the only one in Venezuela to fly classic aircraft in their normal scheduled flights.

1 Beechcraft Model 18
1 Convair CV-440
4 Douglas C-47 Skytrain
2 Douglas C-118A
4 Douglas DC-3A
1 Learjet 25C

Accidents and incidents
On December 25, 1985, a Douglas C-47D (registered YV-425C) ditched off following a double engine failure in flight, the crew was forced to ditch the aircraft that came to rest off Cumana. There were no casualties while the aircraft sank and was lost.

On September 18, 1992, a Douglas C-118A (registered YV-502C) crashed into the Atlantic Ocean while flying from Willemstad to Miami. Weather along the route was poor with a heavy build up of thunderstorms. All 3 occupants on board were killed.

See also
List of defunct airlines of Venezuela

References

External links
Official website

Defunct airlines of Venezuela
Airlines established in 1975
Airlines disestablished in 2008
Venezuelan companies established in 1975
2008 disestablishments in Venezuela